Selenophos is an extremely potent organophosphate acetylcholinesterase inhibitor. It is the selenium analog of the VE nerve agent.

See also
VE (nerve agent)

References

Acetylcholinesterase inhibitors
Organoselenium compounds
Ethyl esters
Diethylamino compounds